Frederick William (III), Landgrave of Hesse-Kassel (15 October 1854 – 14 October 1888) was (titular) Elector of Hesse-Kassel.

Early life
He was the eldest son of Frederick William George Adolph of Hesse-Kassel-Rumpenheim and his second wife Princess Anna of Prussia. His father's first wife was Alexandra Nikolaevna of Russia, daughter of Emperor Nicholas I of Russia but she died in childbirth delivering a son who also died.  From his parents marriage, his siblings were Princess Elisabeth (who married Leopold, Hereditary Prince of Anhalt), Prince Alexander Frederick (who married Baroness Gisela Stockhorner von Starheim), Prince Frederick Charles of Hesse (who married Princess Margaret of Prussia), Princess Marie-Polyxene (who died young), and Princess Sybille (who married Friedrich Alexander Henry Robert Carl Albert, Baron von Vincke).

His father was the only son of Wilhelm I, Landgrave of Hesse-Kassel-Rumpenheim and Princess Louise Charlotte of Denmark. His maternal grandparents were Prince Charles of Prussia and Princess Marie of Saxe-Weimar-Eisenach.

Like his father he was raised in Denmark.

Landgrave of Hesse
His father died in 1884, and he inherited the title of Landgrave which provided an allowance of £25,000 a year from the German government in addition to his extensive estates in Holstein and Hesse Castle.

Death
Frederick William III died on 14 October 1888 during a trip aboard the steamship Volga from Batavia to Singapore. He was traveling with Barons von Hugo, von Trott and von der Schulenburg. According to his obituary he died:

"under circumstances that leave no room for doubt whatever as to the death of his Royal Highness. His Royal Highness, who had been a long time traveling in the tropics, had in the course of his wanderings reached Java. The only possible conclusion which could be come to was that, overcome by some sudden mental disturbance, to which his previous illness may have made him susceptible, his Royal Highness had, quite unconscious of what he was doing, gone through the port of his cabin, and had dropped into the sea. He could not merely have fallen through, as the window was so narrow that a person could only pass through by dint of some exertion. The idea of premeditated suicide is entirely without foundation."

As was not married and had no children, he was succeeded by his brother, Alexander Frederick, who was an accomplished musician despite being nearly blind. Upon his brother and heirs morgantic marriage in 1925, he abdicated in favor of their younger brother, Prince Frederick Charles of Hesse, who had been elected King of Finland in 1918 but renounced the throne two months later. Prince Frederick married Princess Margaret of Prussia, youngest sister of Kaiser Wilhelm II and a granddaughter of Queen Victoria of Great Britain.

Honours and awards
He received the following awards:
 : 
 Grand Cross of the Ludwig Order, 10 September 1871
 Knight of the Golden Lion, 12 October 1875
  Kingdom of Prussia:
 Knight of the Black Eagle, with Collar, 26 January 1877
 Grand Cross of the Red Eagle
 Knight of Honour of the Johanniter Order, 18 February 1880
  Duchy of Anhalt: Grand Cross of Albert the Bear
 : Knight of the Elephant, 2 October 1871
  Kingdom of Greece: Grand Cross of the Redeemer
  Mecklenburg: Grand Cross of the Wendish Crown, with Crown in Ore
  Nassau Ducal Family: Knight of the Gold Lion of Nassau
 : Grand Cross of the Order of Duke Peter Friedrich Ludwig, with Golden Crown, 24 September 1877
 : Order of Osmanieh, 1st Class
 : Knight of St. Alexander Nevsky
 : Grand Cross of the Württemberg Crown, 1875

Ancestors 

|-

References

House of Hesse
Landgraves of Hesse
1854 births
1888 deaths
18th-century German people